Claudia Russo (born 1983) is a beauty pageant contestant who represented Italy in Miss World 2008 in South Africa. She has an academic degree in fashion design.  She's a model for catwalk and photoshoot in Italy; she works also for RAI and Mediaset television in 2007 with Paolo Bonolis.  Her ambitions are to be an actress in United Kingdom or in her country.  She's tall at 178 cm for 53 kg.  She has dark blonde hair and dark green eyes. She loves fashion and Italian football.  Her favourite designer is Alexander McQueen and her favourite team is A.C. Milan.

External links
 Miss Mondo Italia 2008

1983 births
Living people
Miss World 2008 delegates
Italian beauty pageant winners
People from Messina
Models from Sicily